Thomas William McGarry was a Canadian politician. He served as a Conservative Member of the Legislative Assembly of Ontario for Renfrew South from 1905 to 1919, and as provincial treasurer from 1914 to 1919. He was born to Thomas McGarry and Mary Dowdall. He died in 1935.

References

External links

Finance ministers of Ontario
Progressive Conservative Party of Ontario MPPs
1871 births
1935 deaths